The Eastern Illinois Panthers are the intercollegiate athletic programs of Eastern Illinois University (EIU) located in Charleston, Illinois, United States. The Panthers athletic program is a member of the Ohio Valley Conference (OVC) and competes at the NCAA Division I level in the Football Championship Subdivision. EIU's colors are blue and gray. Selected as the team mascot in 1930, EIU's panther was informally known as "Billy" for many years and was officially named "Billy the Panther" in 2008. Panther teams have won five NCAA national championships in three sports. The Panthers also won the 1969 NAIA men's soccer title.

History

Eastern Illinois athletics began in the school's very first year, with the inaugural football team taking the field only three weeks after the first students arrived on campus in 1899.

Eastern Illinois was a member of the Interstate Intercollegiate Athletic Conference from 1912 to 1970. From 1978 to 1982 they were members of the Mid-Continent Athletic Association which was absorbed by the Association of Mid-Continent Universities later known as the Mid-Continent Conference now the Summit League till 1996. In 1996 they joined the Ohio Valley Conference which is their current conference.

A member of the Ohio Valley Conference since 1996, Eastern Illinois University sponsors teams in ten men's and ten women's NCAA sanctioned sports. The Panthers' men's soccer team and men's and women's swimming teams compete as associate members of the Summit League since those sports are not sponsored by the OVC. The OVC merged its men's tennis league into that of the Horizon League after the 2021–22 school year, with all OVC teams in that sport, including Eastern Illinois, becoming Horizon associates.

Sports sponsored

Baseball

1973 NCAA Division II World Series Third Place.
1978 NCAA Division II World Series Fifth Place.
1981 NCAA Division II World Series Runner-Up.
The Panther baseball team has appeared in two NCAA Division I Baseball Championship, in 1999 and 2008.

Basketball

Men's basketball

NAIA Tournament appearances (6) 1947, 1949, 1950, 1952, 1953, 1957. With a combined record of 7–7. Highest finish, 4th: 1957.
NCAA Division II Tournament appearances each year from 1975 to 1980. Highest finish, 3rd: 1976 and 1978.
NCAA Division I Tournament appearances (1992 and 2001).
All time tournament results

Women’s basketball

NCAA Division I Tournament appearance 1988.

Men's cross country
Team Championships:
1968 – NCAA College Division National Champions
1969 – NCAA College Division National Champions
1977 – NCAA Division II National Champions

Football

1978 Division II National Champion
 1980 Division II National Runner-Up.
NCAA Division I Football Championship tournament appearances: 1982, 1983, 1986, 1989, 1995, 1996, 2000, 2001, 2002, 2005, 2006, 2007, 2009, 2012, 2013, 2015.
Conference Titles: 1912, 1913, 1914, 1928, 1948, 1980, 1981, 1982, 1983, 1984, 1986, 1995, 2001, 2002, 2005, 2006, 2009, 2012, 2013
All time tournament results

Men’s golf
National Finishes:
1969 - NAIA 4th Place 
1972 - NAIA 8th Place
Individual National Champions:
1972 - Gaylord Burrows - NAIA

Soccer

Men's soccer

 1969 – NAIA National Champion.
 NCAA Division II runners-up in 1979, 3rd in 1978, and 4th in 1974.
 Stripped of 1981 Division I 3rd-place finish.

Women’s soccer
The Panther women’s soccer team has appeared in four NCAA Division I Women's Soccer Tournaments in 2001, 2002, 2003, and 2004.

Softball
The Panther softball team has appeared in two Women's College World Series, in 1971 and 1974.

Men’s swimming and diving
Individual National Champions:
1973 - Bob Thomas, NCAA Division II 200 yard backstroke
1973 - Bob Thomas, NCAA Division II 400 yard IM
1973 - Jon Mayfield, NCAA Division II 200 yard breaststroke
1973 - NCAA Division II 400 yard medley (Bob Thomas, Jon Mayfield, Dan Cole, Dave Toler)
1974 - Bob Thomas, NCAA Division II 200 yard backstroke
1974 - Bob Thomas, NCAA Division II 400 yard IM
1974 - Jon Mayfield, NCAA Division II 200 yard breaststroke
1974 - NCAA Division II 400 yard medley (Bob Thomas, Jon Mayfield, Brian Forsberg, Dave Toler)
1975 - Jon Mayfield, NCAA Division II 200 yard breaststroke

Track and field

Team Championships (men's):
1974 – NCAA Division II National Champions
1976 — NCAA Division II National Runner-up

Individual Champions:
1955 – Ray White, NAIA Long Jump
1967 – John Craft, NAIA Triple Jump
1969 – John Craft, NCAA College Division Triple Jump
1972 – Rodney Jackson, NCAA College Division 400 hurdles
1973 – Rodney Jackson, NCAA College Division 400 hurdles
1974 – Darrell Brown, NCAA Division II Long Jump
1975 – Toni Ababio, NCAA Division II Long Jump
1975 – Toni Ababio, NCAA Division II Triple Jump
1976 – Ed Hatch, NCAA Division II 400 Meter Dash
1979 – Robert Johnson, NCAA Division II 110 hurdles
1981 — 4x400 Relay, Women’s Track & Field AIAW II
1981 – Augustine Oruwari, NCAA Division II 110 hurdles
1988 – Jim Maton, NCAA Division I 800 meter run (Indoor)
1992 – Dan Steele, NCAA Division I 400 hurdles

Volleyball
The Eastern Illinois volleyball team has been the Ohio Valley Conference champions in 1998 and co champions in 2004. The volleyball team has made one NCAA Division I women's volleyball tournament appearance in 2001.

Athletic facilities

Current facilities
Facilities are housed on the west side of the EIU campus between 4th Street and Grant Avenue.
Coaches Stadium at Monier Field — Baseball
Darling Courts — Men's and women's tennis 
Lakeside Field — Men's and women's soccer
Lantz Arena — Men's and women's basketball, Volleyball
Lantz Field House — Men's and women's indoor track and field
O’Brien Field — Football, Men's and women's outdoor track and field
Ray Padovan Pool — Men's and women's swimming and diving
Tom Woodall Panther Trail — Men's and women's cross country
Williams Field — Softball
Men's and women's golf practice at four local courses including Charleston Country Club, Mattoon Country Club, Meadowview Golf Course and Bent Tree Golf Course.

Former facilities
Pemberton Hall — Men’s Basketball
McAfee Gymnasium — Men’s Basketball
Schahrer Field — Football (1899–1948)

Club and intramural facilities
Student Rec Center — Intramural sports

Notable former athletes

Baseball
 Tim Bogar, retired Major League Baseball infielder
 Zach Borenstein (born 1990), baseball outfielder
Randy Myers, former American Major League Baseball pitcher with the New York Mets, Cincinnati Reds, San Diego Padres, Chicago Cubs, Baltimore Orioles and the Toronto Blue Jays between 1985 and 1998. 4x MLB All-Star.
 Marty Pattin, former MLB baseball pitcher for the California Angels, Seattle Pilots, Milwaukee Brewers, Boston Red Sox, and Kansas City Royals
 Stan Royer, MLB baseball player for the St. Louis Cardinals and Boston Red Sox 
 Kevin Seitzer, retired all-star Major League Baseball player

Basketball
 Henry Domercant, former professional basketball player in Europe
 Kevin Duckworth, former NBA All-Star forward
 Kyle Hill, former professional basketball player in Europe
 Jay Taylor, former NBA player for the New Jersey Nets

Football
 Brad Childress, former head coach of the Minnesota Vikings
Jimmy Garoppolo, quarterback for the San Francisco 49ers
 Jeff Gossett, former NFL punter for the LA/Oakland Raiders and 3 other NFL teams
 Kamu Grugier-Hill, linebacker for the Miami Dolphins
 Alexander Hollins, wide receiver for the Minnesota Vikings
John Jurkovic, former NFL Defensive tackle for the Green Bay Packers and Jacksonville Jaguars
 Tim Kelly offensive coordinator for the Houston Texans
Ray McElroy, former NFL Cornerback for the Indianapolis Colts and Chicago Bears
 Sean Payton, head coach of the New Orleans Saints and winner of Super Bowl XLIV
Ted Petersen, retired NFL Offensive/Defensive tackle for the Pittsburgh Steelers, Cleveland Browns, and Indianapolis Colts
 Tony Romo, former quarterback for the Dallas Cowboys and now a sportscaster 
 Micah Rucker, former wide receiver for the Pittsburgh Steelers, Kansas City Chiefs, and New York Giants; also played in the Arena Football League
 Mike Shanahan, former head coach of the Los Angeles Raiders, Denver Broncos and Washington Redskins and 3 times Super Bowl winner.
 Chris Szarka, retired Canadian Football League fullback
 Pierre Walters, former NFL linebacker for the Kansas City Chiefs

Handball
 Tim Dykstra, former handball player who competed in the 1984 Summer Olympics.

MMA
 Matt Hughes, 2x NCAA All-American wrestler, former UFC Welterweight Champion
 Kenny Robertson, 4x NCAA Division I qualifier for wrestling; current mixed martial artist for the UFC
 Mike Russow, current mixed martial artist
 Matt Veach, current mixed martial artist

Rugby
Lauren Doyle, represented the United States of America for Rugby sevens at the 2016 Summer Olympics

Soccer
 Schellas Hyndman, former head coach of soccer's FC Dallas
 Matt Bobo, former North American Soccer League player
 John Baretta, former North American Soccer League goalkeeper
 George Gorleku, former Major Indoor Soccer League (1978–92) player
 LeBaron Hollimon, former National Professional Soccer League (1984–2001) player
 Damien Kelly, former National Professional Soccer League (1984–2001) player
 Mark Simpson, former goalkeeper and assistant coach for D.C. United
 Jason Thompson, former player for D.C. United
 Glen Tourville, former Major Indoor Soccer League (1978–92) player

Track
 John Craft, placed 5th in the Men’s triple jump at the 1972 Summer Olympics
 Sandy Osei-Agyemang, advanced to the second round in the Men's 100 metres and Men's 4 × 100 metres relay at the 1972 Summer Olympics
 Dan Steele, track All-American, 400-meter National Champion, and Bronze Medalist at the 2002 Winter Olympics
 Darrin Steele, competed at the 1998 Winter Olympics and the 2002 Winter Olympics

References

External links
 

 
Sports clubs established in 1895
1895 establishments in Illinois